The AEC Q-type is an AEC-built, side-mounted-engine, single- and double-decker bus that was launched in 1932.

It was designed by G. J. Rackham, an employee of the American firm Yellow Coach from 1922 to 1926, leading him into contact with the Fageol Twin Coach. It was not until a visit to America in the late 1920s that Rackham noted the success of the 1925 Twin Coach which had won large sales to American operators. The result was Rackham returned to Southall (AEC's Works) with the idea of implementing American practice of side-mounted engines in British bus production.

Design
The Q-type, although based on the Twin Coach, had many differences, the most noticeable being whilst the Twin Coach had two engines (hence the name) the AEC Q only had one. This overcame the many complications arising from the need for a second engine for the transmission. London General Omnibus Company received the first Q-type vehicle with a crash gearbox although all subsequent vehicles had the pre-select version. The engine was available in either petrol or diesel incarnation and was located longitudinally behind the front axle, intended to be hidden by the staircase (double-decker version). This allowed the driver's cab to be located on the front overhang with the entrance opposite, even though some body builders didn't use this facility and had a centre entrance. Its modern full-frontal design made it look very similar to buses built in the 1950s and 1960s.

The demise, but one success
The Q failed to attract the attention of the British operators and failed to find a market in the UK, unlike Fageol in the US. One of the reasons was the Q's susceptibility to problems, the most worrying being that the carburettors on the petrol-engined models caught fire. The recommended solution was just as worrying ... increasing the revs until the fire went out! However, the vehicle was just too revolutionary for the conservative-minded bus industry, with the result was that the Q did not obtain the popularity of the other AEC models, so the project was dropped, last appearing in the 1937 catalogue.

One version that was an oddity was the AEC 761T trolleybus version, of which only five were built.

However, London Transport did find the single-deck model useful for its needs and, accordingly, bought over 200 of the diesel-engined version. They led full service lives.

References

Thackray, Brian (2001). The AEC Story: Part 1. Venture Publications Ltd. 
Townsin, A. A. (1980). Blue Triangle. Transport Publishing Company. 

Q-type
Cab over vehicles
Double-decker buses